Marlene Juanita Simons (July 1, 1935 – March 13, 2006) was an American Republican politician and a former member of the Wyoming House of Representatives representing District 1. She served from 1979 until 2003.

References

External links
Official page at the Wyoming Legislature

Republican Party members of the Wyoming House of Representatives
People from Deadwood, South Dakota
People from Crook County, Wyoming
1935 births
2006 deaths
20th-century American politicians